Clausthal-Zellerfeld is a town in Lower Saxony, Germany. It is located in the southwestern part of the Harz mountains. Its population is approximately 15,000. The City is the location of the Clausthal University of Technology. The health resort is located in the Upper Harz at an altitude between 390 and 821 m above sea level.

Geography 
Clausthal-Zellerfeld is located on the Upper Harz Plateau. The environment is less mountainous compared to most of the Harz, but only hilly. As a result, the immediate surrounding area is less wooded and there are more meadow areas. Scattered in and around Clausthal-Zellerfeld are numerous dams and streams of the Upper Harz Water Regale.

The depression between Clausthal and Zellerfeld marks a natural "borderline".

Southwest extends the "Small Clausthal valley".

City districts 
 Altenau-Schulenberg im Oberharz (since 2015)
 Buntenbock (since 1972)
 Clausthal-Zellerfeld
 Wildemann (since 2015)

History 
Clausthal-Zellerfeld originally consisted of two towns which were merged in 1924 to form an administrative unit. Clausthal is well known for the old Clausthal University of Technology and its magnificent buildings, while Zellerfeld is a typical tourist resort for hikers and winter sportsmen. Clausthal-Zellerfeld is the largest town in the area that is situated in the mountains rather than on the edge.

Mining in the area began in the 16th century. Modern wire rope was invented to service the iron mines in the 1830s by the German mining engineer Wilhelm Albert in the years between 1831 and 1834 for use in mining in the Harz Mountains in Clausthal. It was quickly accepted because it proved superior to ropes made of hemp or to metal chains, such as had been used before and soon found its way into diverse applications, including most notably, suspension bridges. The Innerste Valley Railway was inaugurated in 1877 and extended to Altenau in 1914. The large station building and 70 other buildings in the town were destroyed in an air raid on 7 October 1944. 92 people lost their lives.

Mining activity halted in 1930 because the ore deposits were exhausted. Today, there are large remains of mines in the surrounding Harz region, some of which are now museums. The railway line was closed in 1976. The former railway station, which was rebuilt from 1961–1963 after being destroyed in 1944, houses the tourist information and the municipal library today.

The Clausthal University of Technology was established in 1775 for the education of mining engineers. Today, it is a technical university for teaching engineering, natural science (especially chemistry, materials science and physics) and business studies.

Politics

Town council 
2006 local elections:
 SPD: 19 seats
 CDU: 9 seats
 FDP: 3 seats
 UWG: 2 seats (independent electors community)

Culture and sights 

 Oberharzer Wasserwirschaft (Upper Harz Water Management)

Museums 
 Upper Harz Mining Museum
 GeoMuseum of Clausthal University of Technology

Buildings 
 Plants of Upper Harz Water Regale
 Market Church in Clausthal, the largest wooden church in Germany with 2,200 seats, built 1639-42. Tower dating from 1637.
 Old pharmacy Bergapotheke in Zellerfeld, built in 1674, with wood carvings
 Protestant Salvator Church in Zellerfeld, built 1674-83
 Clausthal mint (1617–1849)
 Oberbergamt building in Clausthal, built 1726-30
 Dietzel House in Zellerfeld, dating from 1674
 Former railway station, destroyed 1944 and rebuilt 1961-63
 House where Robert Koch was born

Infrastructure 

The retail trade is mainly located in the main center around Adolph-Roemer-Straße in the Clausthal district. Small-scale retail can be found in the side center in the Zellerfeld district. At the beginning of 2000, an area at the former Ostbahnhof was designated as a special location for large-scale retail. Further supermarkets can be found at the northern exit of Zellerfeld. Overall, the retail trade in the former mountain town is not very well developed and is now suffering from the general decline in shops.

The development of the Clausthal University of Technology is of great importance for the mining town of Clausthal-Zellerfeld, as it increases the attractiveness and attraction of the location for innovative investments. The development of the TU Clausthal and the cooperation between local companies and science is a decisive advantage for the business location.

In addition to the usual craft businesses, there is a relatively large window factory as well as several companies spun off from the Clausthal University of Technology or CUTEC, which specialize primarily in particle measurement technology in testing technology.

Tourism is another important branch of the economy in Clausthal-Zellerfeld, but above all in its districts Altenau, Buntenbock, Schulenberg and Wildemann.

Traffic 
From 1877 to 1976, Innerstetalbahn trains ran from the station to Altenau and Langelsheim . Today the public transport is served by several bus lines, u. a. to Goslar, Osterode am Harz, Altenau and Sankt Andreasberg.

Public facilities 

 State Office for Mining, Energy and Geology with the Lower Saxony Mountain Archive
 CUTEC, Clausthal Environmental Technology Research Center
 State Construction Management South Lower Saxony
 Local fire brigades in the districts Altenau, Clausthal- Zellerfeld, Buntenbock, Schulenberg and Wildemann

Education 
In addition to the primary and secondary school facilities, Clausthal-Zellerfeld also houses the School of Economics and Technology and the Clausthal University of Technology . The facilities of the TU are concentrated on the Feldgraben area campus as well as distributed in the Clausthal city area and on the Tannenhöhe.

Primary school:

 Clausthal primary school
 Wildemann primary school
 Elementary school Zellerfeld

Further Training

 Gymnasium Robert Koch School (open all-day school)
 Clausthal-Zellerfeld secondary and secondary school

Persons

People from Clausthal-Zellerfeld 

 Bernhard Christoph Breitkopf (1695-1777), printer and publisher
 Heinrich Halfeld (1797-1873), engineer
 Carl Adolf Riebeck (1821-1883), industrialist and mining entrepreneur
 Robert Koch (1843–1910), microbiologist
 Otto Erich Hartleben (1864–1905), poet and dramatist
 Robert Förster (1913-1984), diplomat
 Helmut Sander (1920-1988), mayor of Goslar
 Reinhard Roder (born 1941), football player, coach and -functionary
 Dietrich Grönemeyer (born 1952), physician
 Daniel Böhm (born 1986), biathlete

Notable people associated with Clausthal-Zellerfeld 
 Georg Philipp Telemann (1681–1767), composer

 Johann Friedrich Ludwig Hausmann (1782–1859), mineralogist
 Wilhelm Albert (1787–1846), mining administrator and inventor
 Friedrich Adolph Roemer (1809–1869), geologist
 Arnold Sommerfeld (1868–1951), theoretical physicist
 Helmut Kleinicke (1907-1979), engineer at Auschwitz concentration camp who saved Jews during the Holocaust

International relations

Twin towns – Sister cities
Clausthal-Zellerfeld is twinned with:
 L'Aigle, France

Gallery

References

External links 

 clausthal-zellerfeld.de 

 
Towns in Lower Saxony
Goslar (district)
Towns in the Harz
Mining communities in Germany